Nova Press is a French media company established in 1972 by Jean-François Bizot. Nova Press was registered on 4 June 1981.

The company most notably owns the radio stations Radio Nova and TSF Jazz.

Sectors
 Radio: Radio Nova and TSF Jazz
 Internet: Novanet (web design in mainly the field of music, including Nova Planet
 Record label: Nova Records
 Advertising: Nova Régie
 Content Production: Nova Production
 Publishing: Nova Éditions

External links
  Novapress Company details at société.com
  Official website of Nova Press at novaplanet.com

References

Radio broadcasting companies of France
Mass media companies established in 1972
French companies established in 1972
Mass media in Paris